Infest is an American powerviolence band, formed in September 1986 by Joe Denunzio, Matt Domino, Dave Ring and Chris Clift. The band's album covers contained imagery of a political nature, depicting the reality of war and poverty. The group broke up in 1996, having played only a handful of shows outside California.

Discography
 Infest (demo, 1987)
 Infest (EP, Drawblank, 1988) 
 Slave (LP, Off the Disk, 1988)
 Split 8" with Pissed Happy Children (Slap-a-Ham, 1989)
 Mankind (7", Drawblank, 1991)
 KXLU Radioshow (12", Deepsix, 2001)
 No Man's Slave (LP, Deepsix, 2002)
 Days Turn Black (7", Drawblank, 2013)

References 

Hardcore punk groups from California
Powerviolence groups